Boina may refer to:

 It is the Spanish, Portuguese, Galician and Catalan word for beret.
 Dabbahu Volcano, also known as Boina, is a volcano in Ethiopia
 Boina, a former kingdom in Madagascar
 Boina, a village in Dalboșeț Commune, Caraș-Severin County, Romania
 Taxonomic synonym for Boinae, a subfamily of boid snakes.